Brian Lee (born March 26, 1987) is an American former professional ice hockey player. Lee played in the National Hockey League with the Ottawa Senators, who drafted him in the first round, ninth overall in the 2005 NHL Entry Draft, and the Tampa Bay Lightning. Originally considered one of the top defensive prospects, Lee had a solid NHL career but arguably did not live up to expectations of the 9th overall draft selection, only playing in 209 career NHL games.

Playing career

Junior

Brian Lee grew up in Moorhead, Minnesota, and was a stand out player for the Moorhead High School Spuds hockey team. In 2004–05, Lee played junior hockey for the Lincoln Stars of the United States Hockey League (USHL) and had an outstanding season. For his season, he was selected Minnesota's Mr. Hockey as the number one player in Minnesota high school boys hockey in 2005. He was also named the Associated Press' Player of the Year for Minnesota prep boys hockey that year. That year, his senior year, he was one of the few high school players to play for Team USA in the World Junior Hockey Championships.

College

Lee chose to attend the University of North Dakota and played for the college team for two years. Lee would play for the US at the 2006 World Junior Ice Hockey Championships.

Ottawa Senators

In the 2005 NHL Entry Draft, the Ottawa Senators drafted Lee in the first round, 9th overall. Lee made his professional hockey debut in the 2007–08 NHL season. Ottawa then assigned him to their AHL affiliate, the Binghamton Senators, after training camp. Lee was named to the AHL All-Star Game roster in the 2007–08 season. Lee made his NHL regular season debut on March 25, 2008, against the Buffalo Sabres at HSBC Arena in a 6–3 win for Ottawa.

Lee played in 6 games with Ottawa in 2007–08 and in 5 games in 2008–09 before being reassigned to Binghamton for development on October 22, 2008. He was later recalled and finished the season with Ottawa, recording 13 points in 53 NHL games and assuming a more defensive role.

Following the training camp for the 2009–10 season, Lee was once again assigned to Binghamton, while AHL veteran Matt Carkner and newcomer Erik Karlsson remained with Ottawa. Lee's agent stated that Lee was "shocked and surprised that he's not among Ottawa's top-six defencemen."

Tampa Bay Lightning

On February 27, 2012, Lee was traded by the Senators to the Tampa Bay Lightning for Matt Gilroy. Lee was not re-signed by the Lightning at the end of his contract and became an unrestricted free agent.

On December 12, 2014, Lee announced his retirement from professional hockey. Lee had attended training camp with the Nashville Predators in early October, and said he felt good. However, he started having pain in his knee. This stemmed from the same knee injury that he had two corrective surgeries on. Lee stated that he is planning on studying nursing at North Dakota State and anesthesiology at the University of North Dakota. Lee played a total of 209 NHL games with the Ottawa Senators and the Tampa Bay Lightning. During that time he scored 5 goals, and 31 assists. Lee stated that he still wants to be around hockey and looks forward to being able to give back to the community.

Personal information
Brian's brother, John, played NCAA Division I ice hockey with the University of Denver. John was selected by the Florida Panthers in the 5th round (131st overall) of the 2007 NHL Entry Draft.

Career statistics

Regular season and playoffs

International

Awards and honors

References

External links

1987 births
American men's ice hockey defensemen
Binghamton Senators players
Lincoln Stars players
Living people
National Hockey League first-round draft picks
North Dakota Fighting Hawks men's ice hockey players
Ottawa Senators draft picks
Ottawa Senators players
Ice hockey players from Minnesota
Syracuse Crunch players
Tampa Bay Lightning players
People from Moorhead, Minnesota